John Victor (15 April 1892 – 22 September 1935) was a South African middle-distance runner. He competed in the men's 800 metres at the 1912 Summer Olympics.

References

1892 births
1935 deaths
Athletes (track and field) at the 1912 Summer Olympics
South African male middle-distance runners
Olympic athletes of South Africa
People from Masilonyana Local Municipality
Orange Free State people